Doctor Prats is a band from Terrassa in Catalonia, Spain that was formed in 2015.

History 

Doctor Prats was created in 2015, with the intent to be solely an online band. The same year, they released their first album,  (Potatoes with fish). On Saturday, April 11, they performed their first concert in the Faktoria d'Arts in Terrassa, in collaboration with various local artists.

In April 2016, just a year after the first album was released, a second single, called Aham Sigah, was released. They performed the new work at the Bikini Room in Barcelona.

They began performing abroad in 2017, with concerts in France, Hungary, and Japan. The tour ended October 30 at the Sant Narcís fairs in Girona.

Discography 

 2015: Patates amb peix (self-published) 
 2016: Aham Sigah (Música Global)
 2018: Venim de lluny

See also 
 Buhos
 Music of Catalonia
 Catalan rumba
 World music

References 

Musical groups from Catalonia
Catalan rumba
Spanish electronic music groups
Spanish reggae musical groups
Spanish ska groups
Terrassa
Spanish world music groups
Música Global artists